The Sri Lanka Women's Division One Tournament, previously known as the Sri Lanka Women's Cricket Limited Overs Tournament, is a women's domestic one-day cricket competition organised by Sri Lanka Cricket. The competition currently sees eight teams competing in 50-over matches, and has existed since the 2007 season.

The most successful side in the history of the competition, and the current holders as winners of the 2021–22 season, are Sri Lanka Navy Sports Club.

History
The tournament, first named the Sri Lanka Women's Cricket Limited Overs Tournament, began in 2007, following the All Island Women's Cricket Association Challenge Trophy (1999–00 to 2001) and the Singer Challenge Trophy (2002 to 2004). The first tournament saw eight teams competing in a round-robin group, with Slimline Sports Club going unbeaten to win the tournament, beating Colombo Cricket Club in the final. The following season saw the same two teams reach the final, but the title was shared after the match ended in a no result.

Ahead of the 2010 season, a second division of the competition was added, expanding the amount of teams to 18. The second division took place again in 2011 and 2014–15, whilst the format of the competition changed in 2016, from one initial group followed by semi-finals and a final to two initial groups. Sri Lanka Navy Sports Club won four titles in a row (including one shared) during this period, between 2012–13 and 2015. 

Ahead of the 2016–17 season, the tournament was renamed the Sri Lanka Women's Division One Tournament. That season, Sri Lanka Air Force Sports Club beat Sri Lanka Army Sports Club in the final to claim their third title (second outright). The following season, 2018–19, the title was shared between Sri Lanka Army Sports Club and Sri Lanka Navy Sports Club after the final was abandoned, whilst Sri Lanka Navy Sports Club won the most recent edition of the competition in 2020–21, going unbeaten to top the group stage. Navy Sports Club retained their title the following season, 2021–22, topping the table by just one point over Air Force Sports Club.

Teams

Note: The Slimline Sports Club, Colombo Cricket Club, Sri Lanka Air Force Sports Club and Sri Lanka Army Sports Club totals include one shared title. The Sri Lanka Navy Sports Club total includes two shared titles.

Results

See also
 Premier Limited Overs Tournament

References

Sri Lankan domestic cricket competitions
Women's cricket competitions in Sri Lanka
Recurring sporting events established in 2007
2007 establishments in Sri Lanka
Limited overs cricket